Events during the year 1931 in  Northern Ireland.

Incumbents
 Governor - 	 The Duke of Abercorn 
 Prime Minister - James Craig

Events
9 January – Ulster Canal abandoned.
Ulster Protestant League established.

Sport

Football
The Northern Ireland international soccer team change the colour of their shirt from blue to green.
Irish League
Winners: Glentoran

Irish Cup
Winners: Linfield 3 - 0 Ballymena United

Births
24 January – Charles Harding Smith, loyalist paramilitary
15 February – John Erritt, Deputy Director of the British Government Statistical Service (died 2002).
8 April – Paddie Bell, folk singer (died 2005).
9 April – Patrick Walsh, Bishop of Down & Connor (1991- ).
15 April – Sir Kenneth Bloomfield, head of the Northern Ireland Civil Service and member of the Northern Ireland Victims Commission and the Independent Commission for the Location of Victims' Remains.
25 April – James Fenton, Ulster Scots poet (died 2021).
15 June – Martin Smyth, Unionist politician and minister of the Presbyterian Church in Ireland.
28 June – John Morrow, Presbyterian minister and peace activist (died 2009).
29 June – Brian Hutton, Baron Hutton, Law Lord.
4 July – Stephen Boyd, actor (died 1977).
5 August – Billy Bingham, international footballer and manager (died 2022).
25 October – Jimmy McIlroy, international footballer.
31 December – Bob Shaw, science fiction novelist (died 1996).

Deaths

See also
1931 in Scotland
1931 in Wales

References